The Tripoli International Stadium is a multi-purpose stadium in Tripoli, Libya. It can hold 65,000 spectators.

It is the main venue used by the Libyan national football team in its FIFA World Cup and African Nations Cup qualifying matches as well as friendlies and other international games.

The stadium hosted many games of the 1982 African Cup of Nations held in Libya along with the 28 March Stadium in Benghazi; it was the venue for the final between Ghana and Libya. It hosted the 2002 Italian Supercup between Juventus and Parma, which Juventus won, 2–1.

Its old name (June 11 Stadium) is a reference to the date of the withdrawal of US forces from Libya, June 11, 1970.

References

Sports venues completed in 1982
Football venues in Libya
Sports venues in Libya
Athletics (track and field) venues in Libya
Libya
Buildings and structures in Tripoli, Libya
Multi-purpose stadiums in Libya
1982 establishments in Libya